The cultural history of Karachi goes back at least five thousand years to the emergence of the Indus Valley Civilization in the third millennium B.C. The early culture appears to be essentially Neolithic with widespread use of small chart implements and semi-precious stones. The many megalithic Arab (عرب مسمان) graves around Karachi put it in a class with the megalithic movements of the Arabian Peninsula.

History of Karachi 

Alexander's historians called Karachi Krokola, which literally means "a place of crocodile worship". Around 1558, Karachi was a conglomerate of about two dozen fishing villages, called Kalachi or Kalati. This small settlement was projected into prominence when Seth Bhoju Mal laid the foundation of a small township on the left bank of Lyari River in 1729. "Its rise into notice began with the period of the Kalhora princes in 1793. They first recognised the value of the harbour for commerce. The capture of the Manora fort in 1839 put the British in possession of the town."

The modern port-city of Karachi, however, was developed by authorities of the British Raj in the 19th century. Upon the independence of Pakistan in 1947, the city was selected to become the national capital, and was settled by Muslim Urdu-speaking  Muhajirs (اردو مہاجر قوم) (creators of Pakistan) at the time of the independence in 1947, which radically expanded the city's population and transformed its demographics and economy.

Heritage
The cultural heritage of Karachi after 1947 is that of the Muhajir community of Urdu-speaking Sindhis (اردو مہاجر قوم) and their Urdu language, clothes (کرتا پاجامہ شیروانی), education and foods (Nihari, Biryani, Kabab, Nihariنہاری, بریانی, کباب, حلیم). 

Its earlier heritage includes the story of the 'Kalachi-Jo-Kunn' (whirlpool of Kalachi) in which Moriro performed a feat of strength by killing a monstrous shark that killed all six of his brothers as they were fishing. 

A number of cultural sites in and around Karachi testify to the glorious past of Karachi. In recent years the Sindhi population in the city has surged. 

"WAGU DARR" (earthen cavity for the living of a crocodile) is located at the coastal village of Chashma Goth near Korangi. A natural sweet water spring flows perennially past this site. It is also a crocodile worship center besides Manghopir where people offer meat to the crocodiles and bathe in hot and cold sulphuric springs to treat skin diseases. The ruins of RATO KOT are located in the Korangi Creek. This fort is thought to have been a contemporary settlement of Debal port (Bhambhore in the view of some archaeologists) conquered by Mohammad Bin Qasim in 712 AD. Baked earthen balls used in mechanically-driven cannons of the olden days, shards, glazed tiles and other artifacts are found scattered on the site. The CHOWKUNDI graveyard, a protected monument of the 17 and 18th century AD and BALOCH TOMBS near Memon Goth of Malir exhibit monumental structures of stone-carved graves.

MOKHI-MATARA is yet another cultural site, situated on the top of Narathar Hill near Gadap and located on an ancient route emanating from ancient Debal port to Central Asia. The folklore of Mokhi-Matara is also sung by Sindh's greatest poet, Shah Abdul Latif Bhittai.

Language 
Historically, Sindhi and Balochi were spoken by the native population before the British conquest in 1843 by Charles James Napier. During British rule, many Gujarati and Parsi business families and Christian Goans bureaucrats migrated from Bombay Presidency to Karachi, as it was being developed as a major port. After the independence of Pakistan in 1947, Muslim refugees (Muhajirs) migrated to Karachi. The vast majority of Muhajirs spoke Urdu. Today Karachi is a predominantly Urdu-speaking city with many other languages also spoken in the city. The Pashtuns (Pakhtuns or Pathans), originally from Khyber Pakhtunkhwa and northern Balochistan, are now the city's second largest ethnic group in Karachi after Muhajirs. As high as seven million by some estimates, the city of Karachi in Pakistan has the largest concentration of urban Pakhtun population in the world, including 50,000 registered Afghan refugees in the city. As per current demographic ratio Pashtuns are about 12% of Karachi's population.

Religion

Literature 
Poetry is deeply embedded in Pakistani culture and is often artistic and intellectual commentary. Karachi boasts a large community of intellectuals who come together in designated open spaces to share their talent in poetry events known as mushairas in the local language. Many intellectuals and aspiring poets from all over the nation also flock to Karachi, hoping to find better work opportunities in the city. The theme and subject matter of the poetry can vary immensely, but most are socio-cultural commentaries, often infused with a biting sense of humour.

Certain poets are worth mentioning like Ishrat Afreen, a Pakistani feminist and a prominent poet. Afreen recently launched her second Urdu poetry collection under the name "Dhoop apnay hissay ki".

Some literary figures shifted their focus from poetry to prose and fiction like the case of Mustansar Hussain Tarar, who recently released a collection of short stories entitled "Pandra Kahaniyan".

Non-fiction is also popular in the literary scene of Karachi. This is noticeable through the praise that Ahfazur Rahman received on his book "Sab Say Bari Jang".

Arts

Art academies, arenas and festivals 
Karachi is home to some of Pakistan's important cultural institutions. The National Academy of Performing Arts, located in the newly renovated Hindu Gymkhana offers a two-year diploma course in performing arts that include classical music and contemporary theatre. The All Pakistan Music Conference, linked to the 45-year-old similar institution in Lahore, has been holding its Annual Music Festival since its inception in 2004. The festival is now a well established feature of the city life of Karachi that is awaited anxiously and attended by more than 3000 citizens of Karachi as well as people from other cities.

Aside from regular performances by the nation's biggest musical stars, Karachi also boasts one of the biggest underground music scenes in the country, where traditional musical influences blend with modern, Western style to create a unique brand of fusion music. This style of music has been very popular all across Pakistan and it's becoming quite trendy amongst the nation's up-and-coming musicians. Many of the nation's emerging musicians have based themselves in Karachi because of the excellent employment opportunities in the burgeoning entertainment industry of Karachi. Many of the nation's fresh musical acts can be found in cafes, restaurants and concerts across Karachi, especially in the city's upper middle class and upper class areas.

The National Arts Council (Koocha-e-Saqafat) also has musical performances and mushairas. Karachi has a few museums including the Mohatta Palace Museum and National Museum of Pakistan that regularly have exhibitions related to performance arts. Karachi is also home to the annual Kara Film Festival, which is one of the biggest film festivals in Pakistan and showcases independent Pakistani and international films and documentaries.

Galleries and fine art exhibitions 
Emerging new artists in the field of painting, digital art and calligraphy are currently experiencing a boom. Karachi is home to the Clifton Art Gallery and Koel Gallery. The Calligraphy Artist Bin Qulander is currently exhibiting his work in the aforementioned Gallery under the title of "God in the details".

Education

Cuisine 

Meat (mainly beef) plays a dominant role in Karachi food. Curries, pulses like lentils, called dal, are also very popular. Of all the meats, the most popular are: beef, goat, chicken and seafood. Barbecue food is also extremely popular. Dishes made with rice include pullao and biryani. Different kinds of breads like: Chapati, Naan, Tandoor bread, Paratha and Puri are very popular. Sindhi biryani is also very common in the city.

Festivals 

Karachi is a festive city, and many religious and cultural festivities are observed across the city. Religious events such as Ramadan, Chaand Raat, Eid, Milad un Nabi and Ashura are among the most prominent festivities and are observed passionately with fervor. Shopping reaches its peak during the Eid season, as not only established businesses but vendors from all over the country come to the city to sell their goods to the city's large population, a majority of which is middle class and relatively well-off compared to most other parts of the country. Many rallies and parades are carried out during the events of Milaad un Nabi, Ashura, Jashn-e-Baharan and Nowruz by religious leaders and followers all across the city. Ethnic and religious minorities, like Christians, Hindus, Ismailis etc. also celebrate their events, although not on as large a scale as Islamic events.

Independence Day, which takes place on 14 August, is also a very important event for all Karachiites. A national holiday is commenced all over the country on this date, as homes are decorated with flags and patriotic embellishments, and children sing patriotic songs, known as milli naghmas, to show their love for their nation. The festivity of this day is such that a small cottage industry has emerged in large cities, like Karachi, to supply the decoration demands of Independence Day. And although not as feverish as Independence Day, Defence Day is also passionately observed across the city on 6 September every year. Pakistan Day or Resolution Day is observed on 23 March every year.

The Sindh Cultural Day also gets celebrated in the city in the month of December every year since 2009. People wear traditional Sindhi topi and Ajrak and gather to play songs, dance, and attend watch artists perform.

Popular media

Television 
Numerous channels have their headquarters in Karachi.

Sindh TV, KTN, Kashish, MEHRAN, AWAZ, Dharti, Ajrak TV, Indus, GEO TV, Dawn, ARY, PTV, Samaa Metro News and Duniya News have their TV stations in Karachi.

Radio 
Pakistan Radio, FM 89, FM 103, FM 101, FM 96, FM 106.2

Cinema

National dress 

The national dress of Karachi is Shalwar Qameez, a traditional a garment worn by both women and men in Pakistan and Afghanistan. Shalwar are loose pajama-like trousers. The legs are wide at the top, and narrow at the bottom. The Qameez is a long shirt or tunic. The side seams (known as the chaak) are left open below the waist, which gives the wearer greater freedom of movement.

Ethnic communities 

Karachi dwellers prefer to maintain their basic ethnic identity and lifestyles, and live together with their respective groups in their respective neighborhoods. For example, Kiamari is known for the Kutchi language or Kharadar is for Memons and Agha Khanis, similarly Lyari is known for Baloch and Memons, Nazimabad and Liaquatabad for Muhajirs (Urdu speaking people), and Malir is known for Sindhi. The mentality has been reinforced as a result of serious clashes which have taken place in the recent past among different ethnic groups in this city.

Karachi in popular culture of Sindh
Karachi has been sung about, notably the folk songs from in Sindhi marriages, called Sehra (سهرا) and Ladda (لاڏا ) such as:

آيلڙي مون ته سُئي وڃائيڪراچيءَ جي شهر مان مون سُئي گھُرائي 

sung by Zarina Baloch and

ڪراچيءَ جي شهر مان منڊيون جوڙايمسونا گل ڪراچيءَ جي موٽر ڀرجي آيا

In addition, Karachi is also known for the legend of Morirro Mirbahar, whose braveness has been praised and sung by Shah Abdul Latif Bhitai in his poetry. This legend has also been adapted into a Sindhi movie titled Ghatoo Ghar na Ayaa.

Karachi jaa ddeeha' aee' raatioo, Days and Nights of Karachi is a novel written by Muhammad Bux Johar.

See also 
 Karachi
 Moriro
 Sheedi Mela
 Pir Mangho Urs
 Culture of Sindh
 Culture of Pakistan

References

External links 
 Karachities and their characteristics

 
Sindhi culture